Lotima Taufo'ou Fainga'anuku (born 26 April 1997) is a Tongan-born New Zealand rugby union player who currently plays for  in the Bunnings NPC and Moana Pasifika in Super Rugby. His position is wing.

Early career 
Fainga'anuku was educated at Nelson College from 2011 to 2015. He was a part of the New Zealand Under 20s winning team over England Under 20s 64–17 in the 2017 World Rugby Under 20 Championship.

Senior career 
Tima was named in the  2020 squad after Connor Garden-Bachop had to withdraw because of injury. He was part of the Mako side that won the 2020 Mitre 10 Cup. In June 2021, it was announced that Fainga'anuku would be switching his international eligibility to Tonga using the Olympic loophole, representing Tonga Sevens at the 2020 Men's Rugby Sevens Final Olympic Qualification Tournament, however due to quarantining issues relating to the COVID-19 pandemic he was unable to play, meaning he is still captured by New Zealand. In May 2022 was named in the Tonga national squad.

References

External links 
 
Tasman Mako profile

1997 births
New Zealand rugby union players
Tasman rugby union players
Crusaders (rugby union) players
Rugby union wings
Living people
People educated at Nelson College
USA Perpignan players
Highlanders (rugby union) players
Manawatu rugby union players
New Zealand international rugby sevens players
Moana Pasifika players
Tonga international rugby union players
Tongan rugby union players